Joan Amigó i Barriga (1875–1958) was a Spanish architect, a late representative of the modernism and the most important of this style in Badalona.

Life 
He was born in Badalona on 27 January 1875, son of Francesca Barriga i Torner and Ramon Amigó i Umbert, a chocolatier. The origins of the family are in Canyet, a farmer neighbourhood on the mountain. Soon after his birth, his father died and his mother married again with Jaume Botey i Garriga, a general contractor who influenced Amigó to study architecture and with whom he had his first contact with construction and other related tasks.

First he studied in Liceu Políglota of Barcelona and then architecture in the Architecture High Technique School in the same city and obtained the degree in 1900. Most of their buildings are located in Badalona, where from 1914 to 1924 was municipal architect. Appointed member of the construction council of Sant Josep parish, he was architect of the church for many years, He died in Badalona on 30 December 1958.

Style 
Amigó is part of the second modernist generation, later than Gaudí, Domènech i Montaner or Puig i Cadafalch. Belong to the same college promotion the architect Antoni de Falguera, and the next was that of Salvador Valeri and Alexandre Soler. This generation lived the modernism as a more established trend that did not represent anymore a break with tradition, on the contrary modernism became a tradition.

He is a follower of the modernism, but also receives the news from Europe with influences of the Vienna Secession and even the Glasgow School. These new trends are present in houses Enric Pavillard (1906), Serra Vinyas (1907) and Enric Mir (1908). The last is the most influenced by the Secession and even by Mackintosh. His works include also some factories like Gottardo de Andreis or Can Casacuberta with influences of Wagner, Mackintosh and Olbrich.

Many of his works are signed by his stepfather Jaume Botey because he could not sign private works when he was municipal architect.

Works

Badalona

Other locations

References

Bibliography 

 
 
 

People from Badalona
Architects from Catalonia
Modernist architects